This list is of the Cultural Properties of Japan designated in the category of  for the Prefecture of Aichi.

National Cultural Properties
As of 1 July 2020, fifty-one Important Cultural Properties have been designated (including two *National Treasures), being of national significance.

Prefectural Cultural Properties
Ninety-seven properties have been designated at a prefectural level.

Municipal Cultural Properties
Properties designated at a municipal level include:

See also
 Cultural Properties of Japan
 List of National Treasures of Japan (paintings)
 Japanese painting
 List of Historic Sites of Japan (Aichi)

References

External links
  Cultural Properties in Aichi Prefecture

Cultural Properties,Aichi
Cultural Properties,Paintings
Paintings,Aichi
Lists of paintings